"Sober" is a song by American rock band Bad Wolves. It was their second single off of their second studio album N.A.T.I.O.N.. It topped the Billboard Mainstream Rock Songs chart for two weeks in June 2020.

Background
The song was released in January 2020, as the second single from their second album, N.A.T.I.O.N., with a music video being released at the same time.
The video features frontman Tommy Vext at an addiction recovery meeting. Vext had previously suffered from addiction, and had affected his role in bands he performed with in the past. The song will also be on the soundtrack for the film Sno Babies, a feature film scheduled for late 2020 release that depicts two girl's struggle with opiate addiction.

The song was the band's fifth song in a row to top the active rock chart, and their fourth to top the Billboard Mainstream Rock Songs chart. The song also made the band be the first to have two different songs top the latter chart, with "Killing Me Slowly" topping earlier in the year. Sober stayed atop of the chart for two weeks.

Themes and composition
Lyrically, the song addresses alcohol addiction from multiple perspectives; from the one suffering from it, and from the people who are affected by it second-hand. Vext stated that he aspired to write about addiction from a different perspective than it typically is in modern music, stating:  Vext states that the song also fits into N.A.T.I.O.N.'s larger message of support, inclusion, and anti-suicide, while Loudwire interpreted its lyrics to be about "relationship fragility".

Billboard described the song's sound as a "metal ballad", while Loudwire described it as a "mid-tempo, radio ready rock track". The track primarily plays out on an acoustic guitar and "clap-along beat", with an electric guitar solo at the bridge, and an uplifting tonal shift in the song's final chorus.

Personnel
 Tommy Vext – lead vocals
 Doc Coyle – lead guitar, backing vocals
 Chris Cain – rhythm guitar
 Kyle Konkiel – bass guitar, backing vocals
 John Boecklin – drums

Charts

References

2019 songs
2020 singles
Bad Wolves songs
Eleven Seven Label Group singles